Oliver Vugrin Flindt Drost (born 4 November 1995) is a Danish footballer who plays as a forward for FC Helsingør.

Career

B.93
In the spring 2014, Drost returned to his former youth club, B.93, where he joined the senior squad at the age of 18, signing a two-year contract and immediately debuted in the Danish 2nd Division against Næstved BK.

In the spring of 2014, Drost played 14 games, eight of them starting from the bench. In the following season, he played 26 games, scoring 8 goals. He left the club in the summer 2016, joining Vejle Boldklub.

AC Horsens
On 31 August 2017 AC Horsens announced, that they had loaned Drost from Vejle for the rest of the year. Horsens bought him free at the end of the loan spell.

Kolding IF
On 23 October 2019, Drost joined Kolding IF on a free agent on a contract for the rest of the year. The club announced on 4 January 2020, that he wouldn't get his contract extended.

AC Horsens
After a few weeks on trial, Drost returned to AC Horsens and signed a contract for the rest of the season. The club confirmed on 21 July 2020, that Drost would leave at the end of his contract.

Return to Kolding
On 8 September 2020, Drost returned to Kolding IF as a free agent, signing a one-year contract.

Return to Helsingør
On 11 January 2021, Drost signed a pre-contract, in effect from 1 July 2021, with his former youth club FC Helsingør.

Personal life
Drost's father is from Croatia, while his mother is Danish. He is also the cousin of Emil Berggreen, who also is a footballer. Drost actually went on a trial at his cousins former club, Mainz 05, where Berggreen was playing for at the time. Oliver's sister, Olivia, is also a footballer and has also played for the Danish youth national teams.

References

Danish men's footballers
1995 births
Living people
People from Helsingør
Sportspeople from the Capital Region of Denmark
Boldklubben af 1893 players
Vejle Boldklub players
AC Horsens players
Kolding IF players
Danish Superliga players
Danish 1st Division players
Danish 2nd Division players
Association football forwards
BK Søllerød-Vedbæk players
FC Helsingør players
Denmark youth international footballers